Tomás Monje Gutierréz (21 December 1884 – 1 July 1954) was a Bolivian judge who served as the 41st president of Bolivia on a de facto interim basis from 1946 to 1947.

Background and earlier career
Born in Coroico, La Paz Department, he was a noted intellectual and judge. He served as deputy minister of agriculture 1926-27, after which he was appointed minister of the government and justice. From 1930 until 1936 he was Attorney general.

President of Bolivia
In his capacity as head of the Bolivian Supreme Court, he was named President by the forces that toppled President Gualberto Villarroel via coup d'état on 21 July, 1946. Monje happened to be ill at the time, however, which is why his deputy, Néstor Guillén, filled in for him for 27 days, until Monje was well enough to be sworn in August of the same year. Very much a caretaker president, Monje Gutiérrez was in charge with the simple task of calling elections as soon as possible. This done, he transferred power to the winner of the January 1947 elections, the conservative Enrique Hertzog.

Post-Presidency and death
At that point Monje returned to relative obscurity, dying in La Paz on 1 July, 1954.

Sources 
Mesa José de; Gisbert, Teresa; and Carlos D. Mesa, "Historia de Bolivia", 3rd edition. pp. 577–578.

1884 births
1954 deaths
Presidents of Bolivia
20th-century Bolivian judges
People from Nor Yungas Province
20th-century Bolivian politicians